Štadión na Sihoti is a multi-use stadium in Trenčín, Slovakia. It is currently used mostly for football matches and is the home ground of AS Trenčín. The stadium holds 10,000 people. The ground was built in 1960 and since then was subject to several renovations. These were however rather minor works that included new paintwork or fitting seats in parts of the stands.

History
The stadium was built in the 1960s and used for football matches of AS Trenčín sport club. The original capacity was over 22,000 (mostly for standing) spectators. Due to disrepair the capacity was decreased to 16,000 then to 4,500 in 2008. Renovations began in 2014 to increase the capacity to 10,000. The intensity of the floodlighting is 1,200 lux.

New Arena 
Between 2017–2021, the current stadium will be replaced by new modern all-sitting arena with capacity of around 11,500 spectators.

In 2015 the old stands (except the main stand) were demolished. In June 2017, the construction of new stadium should begin. In the end of 2020 3 main stadia are built  In February 2021 stadium was opened after reconstruction

UEFA U-21 Championship 2000
Štadíón na Sihoti has hosted three matches of UEFA U-21 Championship 2000

International matches
Štadión na Sihoti has hosted one competitive match of the Slovakia national football team.

References

External links
Stadium Database Article
Football stadiums profile

AS Trenčín
Football venues in Slovakia
Buildings and structures in Trenčín
Sports venues completed in 1960
Sport in Trenčín Region
1960 establishments in Czechoslovakia